Transition Records was a jazz record company and label based in Cambridge, Massachusetts established by Tom Wilson in 1955. A short lived label, Transition announced several albums which were left unreleased, including recordings by Jo Mapes, Yusef Lateef, Pepper Adams and Curtis Fuller, Charles Mingus, Jay Migliori, and Sheila Jordan. 

The master for Here Comes Louis Smith (1958) by trumpeter Louis Smith was sold to Blue Note Records, while an unissued Sun Ra recording made by Transition was later released in 1968 by Delmark Records as Sound of Joy. A 1955 session featuring Pepper Adams and John Coltrane was recorded by Transition, but only one song was released on their compilation Jazz in Transition (1956). The recordings were later issued by Blue Note on High Step (1975).

Discography

References

Record labels established in 1955
Record labels disestablished in 1957
Jazz record labels
American independent record labels
1955 establishments in Massachusetts